The sweep Sw of a solid S is defined as the solid created when a motion M is applied to a given solid. The solid S should be considered to be a set of points in the Euclidean space R3. Then the solid Sw which is generated by sweeping S over M will contain all the points over which the points of S have moved during the motion M.

Euclidean solid geometry